Aage Badho is a 1947 Hindi language movie directed by Yeshwant Pithkar, starring Dev Anand, Khurshid, Vasant Thengdi, Kusum Deshpande, and Madhukar Apte.

Cast
Dev Anand
Khurshid
Kamala Kotnis
Vasant Thengdi
Kusum Deshpande
Madhukar Apte

Music
"Aao Jhoom Raha" - Khursheed
"Duniya Pyari Pyari Re" - Khursheed
"Mai Khoj Khoj Kar Haari" - Khursheed
"Naina Rasile Madbhare Mai Albeli Naar" - Manik Varma
"Sawan Ki Ghatao Dhire Dhire Aana" - Mohammed Rafi, Khursheed
"Suno Suno Hey Nar Nari" - Manna Dey
"Taqdir Me Likha Hai" - Khursheed

References

External links
 

1947 films
1940s Hindi-language films
Films scored by Sudhir Phadke
Indian drama films
1947 drama films
Indian black-and-white films
Hindi-language drama films